Cathy Glass is a British author, freelance writer and foster carer.

Her work is strongly identified with both the True Life Stories and Inspirational Memoirs genres. Glass has also written a parenting guide to bringing up children, Happy Kids, a guide to feeding children healthily, Happy Mealtimes, a general wellness guide, Happy Adults, and a writing guide, About Writing and How to Publish.
Glass has written many memoirs about the children she has fostered, many of whom had suffered abuse.

The first title, Damaged, was number one in the Sunday Times best-sellers charts in hardback and paperback. She has now published 28 memoirs based on her experiences as a foster carer; each of these has reached the top ten in the non-fiction best-seller charts in The Times.

The name "Cathy Glass" is a pseudonym. The author writes under a pen name due to the sensitive nature of her source material. The names of the children she writes about are likewise altered.

Fostering and parenting expertise 
Glass used to work for the civil service but left to start a family. The author decided to foster a child after trying unsuccessfully for a baby with then husband John; she had seen an advert in her local paper seeking a foster home for a girl named Mary and applied as a foster carer. 

In 2010, Glass released Happy Kids: The secret to raising well-behaved, contented children, based on her own child-rearing experiences. It introduces the reader to Glass's own "3 Rs technique": Request, Repeat, Reassure.

Writing career 
Glass combines fostering with occasional freelance journalism and commercial writing. Before the release of Damaged she had written on health and social issues for The Guardian and the Evening Standard.

Glass's first book, Damaged was released by HarperCollins in 2007. It focuses on the relationship between Glass and Jodie, an abused child. A year later, in March 2008, Glass followed up with Hidden.

Her fostering memoir, Will You Love Me?, published in September 2013. tells the story of Lucy, her adopted daughter. '
The books "Nobody's Son", "Cruel to Be Kind" and "A Long Way From Home" are all set before Glass adopted Lucy although were released after her book "Will you Love Me?" which tells Lucy's story.
Her latest book An Innocent Baby was released on 16 September 2021 telling the story of Darcey-May and Haylea and "Neglected" was released on 17 February 2022. "A family torn apart" is the newest book that will be released in September 2022.

Popularity and critical appraisal 
Glass's first book Damaged was a number 1 Sunday Times best-seller, both in hardback and paperback.

Although her books deals with harrowing subjects, Guardian journalist Esther Addley noted that Glass's work offers "a certain amount of hope".

In September 2013, Glass and her adopted daughter did an interview with the Daily Mirror, speaking openly for the first time about their relationship. Glass received a large number of letters and emails from readers in response.

References 

British writers
Year of birth missing (living people)
Living people